La Troncal is the seat of La Troncal Canton in the Cañar Province, Ecuador.

The region that would become this significant town, was sparsely populated by farmers until the 1950s. 
The population began to grow in the 1950s, when migrants from Azuay, and the Cañar provinces began to settle in the area in search of new and better job opportunities.

Around the 1990s thanks to the growth of the sugar mill Aztra, migrants  from Manabi also began to move in, by which the population was gradually growing in size and importance.

References 
 www.inec.gov.ec (pdf)

External links 
 Map of the Cañar Province

Populated places in Cañar Province